This is a list of U.S. senators and representatives who opposed the Vietnam War. This includes those who initially supported the war, but later changed their stance to a strong opposition to it.

Senate

House of Representatives

See also 
 Opposition to the Vietnam War
 List of congressional opponents of the Iraq War

References 

American people of the Vietnam War
 
Opposition to the Vietnam War